Sebastjan Sovič (born 26 February 1976 in Slovenj Gradec, Slovenia) is a retired professional handball player. Most of his career he played for RK Gorenje where he was team's captain After leaving RK Gorenje he became head coach of RK Slovenj Gradec since 2009.

References

Living people
Sportspeople from Slovenj Gradec
Slovenian male handball players
1976 births